Ponte is a thick, double knit fabric design produced on double jersey (Rib or Interlock) knitting machines. It is one of the firm, stable structures of knits with a subtle sheen. This fabric is heavier and thicker than a regular jersey . As with most of the other double knit designs, Ponte is reversible. The fabric is also known as ''Ponte di Roma.''

Origin 
Knitters first developed Ponte in Italy. Ponte di Roma means "Roman Bridge" which is suggested by the arrangement of loops.

Composition and Construction 
All knit fabrics are a type of textile possible with various yarns made from multiple fibers types, ranging from natural, synthetics, and blends. To meet the required traits, It is necessary to create Ponte in blends or tri-blends by combining natural and synthetic yarns such as cotton, nylon, spandex, Or Viscose, Polyester, and spandex, and other combinations be Acrylic, etc.

Ponte is a double knit, weft knitting design produced on Rib/Interlock circular knitting machines by manipulating  stockinette stitch, using at least two yarn feeds, looping now on one set of needles, now on the other, to knit two fabrics joined together. it is a double knit fabric structure similar to Milano rib but repeating on four courses. Ponte can be incorporated coarser or finer by selecting the gauge of the knitting machine.

Characteristics 
Ponte fabric is a heavier structure than regular knitted fabrics, which are used in tops and T-shirts. Ponte is fabric with moderate stretch and  drape but still maintains the stretch and comfort of knitted fabric with the added advantage of strength and durability. The gsm is around(>300). Fabric edges do not curl, unlike single knit fabrics.

Use 
The fabric characteristics make it suitable for bottoms such as skirts, treggings, jeggings, track pants, shorts, dresses, and jackets.

References 

Knitted fabrics